The Balaton cherry is a cultivar of sour cherry (Prunus cerasus) native to Hungary, where it was originally named Újfehértói Fürtös. It was introduced to the United States in the 1980s and is now grown there commercially.

Cultivar history 
The Balaton cultivar was first grown in the small Hungarian village of Ujfeherto. The Communist government of post-war Hungary implemented a rigorous selection process to determine the best sour cherry varieties for planting in the nation's collective farms, and Balaton emerged as the winner. It was released commercially in Hungary in 1970. Dr. Amy Iezzoni, a horticultural researcher and cherry breeder at Michigan State University, introduced the cultivar to the United States in 1984. It was released commercially in the United States in 1998. Her Hungarian counterparts wanted the cultivar's commercial name in America to reflect its Hungarian heritage; it was named after Lake Balaton because "about the only thing an American can pronounce [on a map of Hungary] is Lake Balaton."

Fruit characteristics 
The Balaton is a Morello-type sour cherry with a dark burgundy color throughout both the skin and flesh (in contrast to the better-known Montmorency cherry, which has light-colored flesh) and a sweet-tart flavor. It is resistant to rain-cracking and ships well, and the dark color of its fruit means no food coloring needs to be added to give products made from it a red color.

Growing characteristics 
The Balaton is more sensitive to winter injury than other sour cherry cultivars. It has also suffered from disappointing yield quantity in many years. Like most sour cherry varieties, the Balaton is self-fertile, but it appears that yields can be improved by supplementing Balaton trees with pollen from sweet cherry trees.

Hungary receives a portion of the royalties charged on each Balaton cherry tree, some of which is shared with the cultivar's home village of Ujfeherto.

See also 
Cherry production in Michigan

References 

Cherry cultivars
Sour cherries
Flora of Hungary